{{Automatic taxobox
| image = Scarlet chested sunbird.jpg
| image_caption = Scarlet-chested sunbird (Chalcomitra senegalensis)
| taxon = Chalcomitra
| authority = Reichenbach, 1853
| subdivision_ranks = Species
| subdivision = See text
}}Chalcomitra is a genus of African sunbirds. Its members are sometimes included in Nectarinia.

The sunbirds are a group of very small Old World passerine birds which feed largely on nectar, although they will also take insects, especially when feeding young. Flight is fast and direct on their short wings. Most species can take nectar by hovering like a hummingbird, but usually perch to feed most of the time.

The genus Chalcomitra was introduced by the German naturalist Ludwig Reichenbach in 1853. The type species was subsequently designated as the amethyst sunbird. The name Chalcomitra is from the Ancient Greek khalkomitros "wearing a bronze head-band", from khalkos "bronze" and mitra "diadem".
Species
Its members are:

References 

Barlow, Wacher and Disley, Birds of The Gambia'' 

 
Bird genera
Taxa named by Ludwig Reichenbach